Pycnarmon jaguaralis is a moth in the family Crambidae. It was described by Achille Guenée in 1854. It is found in Australia, Papua New Guinea, Indonesia (Seram), the Himalayas, India (Assam), Bhutan and from Malaysia to the Solomon Islands.

Adults are white with streaky black spots.

Subspecies
Pycnarmon jaguaralis jaguaralis
Pycnarmon jaguaralis papualis Munroe, 1958 (Papua New Guinea)

References

Spilomelinae
Moths described in 1854
Moths of Asia
Moths of Oceania